The East Midlands Oil Province, also known as the East Midlands Petroleum Province, covers the petroliferous geological area across the north-eastern part of the East Midlands of England that has a few small oil fields. The largest field in the province is the Welton oil field, the second largest onshore oil field in the UK.

Geography
It comprises Lincolnshire, North Lincolnshire, Nottinghamshire and northern Leicestershire.

History

UK oil production

The UK's first oil field was discovered in the East Midlands, at Hardstoft in east Derbyshire in 1919.  Prior to this, from 1851, oil shale in the Midland Valley in Scotland was used, until 1962.  With North Sea oil, Britain became self-sufficient with oil and became a net exporter of oil in 1981, with exports peaking in 1985 and production peaking in 1999. The UK became a net exporter of gas in 1997 and a net importer of gas in 2004, and also a net importer of oil in 2004. UK consumption of petroleum increases each year. Per capita consumption of oil annually is about 1.3 tonnes. The UK has the capacity to refine 92 million tonnes of crude oil a year.

Currently the North Sea is producing around 1.5m barrels of oil a day. The peak was in 2000 at 4.5m a day. The Brent oilfield is being decommissioned. The United Kingdom Continental Shelf has reserves of between 12 - 24bn barrels. In 2014, around 14% of the UK's gas came from Russia via Ukraine.

Onshore oil
Until 1990, relatively little oil was produced by UK onshore oil industry. This rapidly increased to peak between 1991 and 1999, where around 5 million tonnes of oil was produced each year - 5.4 million tonnes, the most, was produced in 1996. Since 1999 it has gradually declined to around 1 million tonnes a year. Onshore UK natural gas peaked in 2001. Cumulatively, onshore oil production has produced around 2% (around ) of offshore (North Sea) production. The East Midlands Province provides 11% of UK onshore oil, 65% of the total excluding Wytch farm. So far, the Province has provided around 6 million tonnes of oil. In total, the UK has around 15 million tonnes of onshore oil left.

Although onshore oil reserves are much less, it costs much less to find and develop onshore oil. Depleted onshore oilfields at Gainsborough and Welton will be used for gas storage, of which the UK has little allocated reserves. The UK has reserves of 12 days of gas, compared to 91 days in France and 77 days in Germany.

Discoveries 
Oil was discovered at Kelham Hills in the 1920s. In June 1939, BP (then the D'Arcy Exploration Company) discovered oil at Eakring; although this was not announced until September 1944. During the war the field produced over 300,000 tons of oil or 2,250,000 barrels from 170 pumps. Oil was also drilled for during the war at Caunton and Kelham Hills.

Welton Gathering Centre
This is actually at Reepham near Sudbrooke on railway, and opened on 21 May 1986 by Alick Buchanan-Smith, the Energy minister. The Centre is the home of Star Energy (East Midlands) Ltd on Barfield Lane. In the early 1990s, a 1,000 tonnes of oil was taken on a train to Immingham every other day. When building the centre, BP discovered a  plesiosaurus which was displayed in Scunthorpe Natural History Museum.

Oil companies
BP acquired Candecca Resources and Cambrian Exploration from Trafalgar House in July 1987 for £21m. Candecca Resources Ltd was a subsidiary of BP. It was bought by Kelt UK Ltd in April 1992. Kelt UK Ltd was a subsidiary of Kelt Energy plc and Edinburgh Oil and Gas plc.

Most of the oilfield licences were owned by BP Exploration, when they were bought by Pentex Oil of Aberdeen in March 1989. Star Energy bought Pentex Oil in August 2005 for £38.5m.

Geology
The Province comprises a major series of Carboniferous rift basins. Oil is found in Silesian sandstones and fractured Dinantian limestones.

Welton oil fields
Most oil is transported by road tanker. It is the main part of the East Midlands Province oilfield, where thirty three oil fields have been discovered, including areas outside of Lincolnshire. Oil had been discovered in Corringham in 1958, Gainsborough in 1960, Glentworth in 1961, and Torksey in 1962. Oil was also found in Nocton in the 1960s.

East Glentworth
Found near the A15 and B1398, just south-west of Caenby Corner and near the (now exhausted) Glentworth Oilfield at Glentworth. Discovered in March 1987 by BP, with production starting in February 1993. Formerly owned by Pentex Oil UK Ltd and now owned by Star Energy. Taken by road tanker to Gainsborough.

Scampton North
Discovered in October 1985 by BP with production starting in February 1989. Owned by Star Energy (East Midlands) Ltd and originally run by Candecca. Transported by road tanker to the Welton Gathering Centre at Reepham. The original Scampton Oilfield ceased production in 1988.

Cold Hanworth
Discovered in September 1997 by Candecca, with production starting in September 1998 at Cold Hanworth. Owned by Star Energy (East Midlands) Ltd, although originally run by Candecca. Transported by road tanker to the Welton Gathering Centre, which is just south of the oil field at Reepham.

Stainton
Just north-east of Welton at Stainton by Langworth. Discovered by BP in July 1984, with production starting June 1987. Owned by Star Energy (East Midlands) Ltd. Originally run by Candecca. Situated on the Lincoln-Market Rasen (Newark - Grimsby) railway line and taken by road to the Welton rail terminal at Reepham.

Fiskerton Airfield
Discovered in November 1997 by Cirque with production starting in August 1998 on the former RAF Fiskerton. It is owned 48% by Cirque Energy (UK) Ltd, 32% by Altaquest Energy Corp (UK) Ltd, 18% by Courage Energy UK Ltd and 2% by Mermaid Resources (UK) Ltd. Run by Cirque Energy. Pipeline to the Welton Gathering Centre.

Welton
Largest of the fields, with about 2 million tonnes of initial oil reserves at Welton. Discovered in February 1981 by BP with production starting in November 1984. Owned by Star Energy (East Midlands) Ltd. Originally run by Candecca and BP. Transported by rail. It is the second largest onshore oilfield in the UK after Wytch Farm in Dorset. The next largest is Stockbridge, Hampshire, run by Star Energy. It is even bigger than Eakring, which kept the UK going in World War Two. It is very much larger than all the other onshore fields.

Nettleham
Discovered in March 1983 by BP with production starting in October 1985. Owned by Star Energy (East Midlands) Ltd, although originally run by BP and Candecca. Oil transported by pipeline to the Welton Gathering Centre.

Keddington
Next door and north-east of Louth on the River Lud at Keddington. Discovered in January 1998 by Candecca, with production beginning in September 1998. Formerly owned 65% by ROC Oil (UK) Ltd and 35% by ROC Oil (CEL) Ltd. Bought in March 2007 by Egdon Resources for £250,000 with the two wells closed. Egdon restarted production in April 2007 and producing about  a day. Up to Feb 2009, produced  of oil. Estimated to be  of oil. Taken by road tanker to the Welton Gathering Centre.

Farley's Wood (Nottinghamshire)
Owned by Onshore Production Services Ltd (OPS) or OOSL. Discovered in March 1983, production started July 1985, road tanker to Welton. Originally owned by EMOG. Situated in between Walesby and Tuxford.

Egmanton (Nottinghamshire)
The field was developed by BP Petroleum Development. Production started in July 1955 and production peaked in 1958.

Gainsborough based fields
None of these fields are in Lincolnshire, but oil from the petroleum play is collected at Gainsborough. The area around Gainsborough known as the Gainsborough Trough.

Beckingham West (Nottinghamshire)
Discovered in July 1985 by BP with production starting in October 1987. Formerly owned by Pentex Oil UK Ltd. Oil transported by pipeline to Gainsborough. The field is operated by IGas Energy which acquired Star Energy in 2011. Situated just off the A631 at Beckingham. Known also as the Gainsborough-Beckingham oil field. Production is near the Beckingham Marshes' RSPB nature reserve with daily production of 300 barrels of crude oil and 1 million cubic feet of natural gas. The gas is piped to a nearby power plant. The wells in the field were fracked using lower fluid volumes than used for Shale techniques.  This method is similar to, but with lower volumes than hydraulic fracturing for the extraction of shale gas.

Kirklington (Nottinghamshire)
Situated just south of Eakring towards Newark on the A617 at Kirklington. Owned by Star Energy Oil & Gas Limited 75% and Star Energy Oil UK Limited 25%. Formerly owned by Pentex. Discovered in December 1985 by BP with production starting March 1991. Taken by road tanker to Gainsborough.

Rempstone (Nottinghamshire)
Far south of Nottinghamshire at junction of A60 and A6006 at Rempstone in the far south of Nottinghamshire. Owned by Star Energy Oil & Gas Ltd 75% and Oil UK Ltd 25%. Discovered in December 1985 by Pentex, with production started June 1991. Formerly owned by Pentex. Road tanker to Gainsborough. Operated by Star.

Long Clawson (Leicestershire)
Owned by Star Energy Oil & Gas Ltd 75% and Star Energy Oil UK Ltd 25%. Discovered in March 1986, with production started December 1990. Originally owned by Pentex. Road tanker to Gainsborough. Situated on Clawson Hill at Long Clawson.

Other independent oil fields
These are not run by Star Energy and oil is usually tankered direct to ConocoPhillips' Humber Refinery in South Killingholme near Immingham in North Lincolnshire.

Whisby
Discovered in January 1985 by BP with production starting in May 1990 at Whisby Moor near North Hykeham. Owned and ran by Blackland Park Exploration Ltd, although originally ran by EMOG (East Midlands Oil & Gas - a UK division of Fortune Oil). The Whisby 4 and now the Whisby 5 wells are the currently producing wells and have now cumulatively more than doubled all historical production. Oil is transported by road tanker to Immingham.

West Firsby
Discovered in January 1988 by Enterprise Oil (former oil division of British Gas plc), with production starting in August 1991 at West Firsby north of Lincoln, just west of Spridlington. Owned 53% by Tullow Oil and 47% by Edinburgh Oil & Gas plc. Originally ran by Tullow Oil and Enterprise Oil, now ran by Europa since May 2003. Taken by road tanker to Immingham's ConocoPhillips Humber Refinery.
Sourced by early Namurian pro-deltaic shales. Found on a Variscan inversion anticline on a boundary fault of the Dinatian-Namurian Gainsborough Trough.

Crosby Warren
It was discovered in May 1986 by RTZ (Rio Tinto Group), with production starting in October 1987. Just north-east of Scunthorpe, near the junction of the A1077 and A1029, just north of the Corus steel works. Just south of a Romano-British settlement. Originally run by Edinburgh Oil & Gas, then bought by Europa Oil & Gas on 30 November 2006. Oil is transported by road tanker.

Newton on Trent
Discovered in April 1998 by AltaQuest with production starting in September 1998. Owned by Courage Energy (UK) Ltd and ran by AltaQuest. Oil is taken by road tanker to the ConocoPhillips Humber refinery in Immingham. Production ended in July 2000. Run by Blackland, and previously owned by Floyd Energy. Situated just south of the village.

Future oil fields
Possible production may take place at Broughton and Brigg in North Lincolnshire.

References

External links
 BBC Lincolnshire
 Hydrocarbon prospectivity of Britain's onshore basins (PDF)
 Map of onshore fields in Britain, including the East Midlands Province (PDF)

News items
 Edgdon Resources drilling at Dukes Wood in January 2010

Oil fields of England
BP oil and gas fields
Geography of Lincolnshire
Geography of Nottinghamshire
Geography of Leicestershire
East Midlands